Anthony Thomas Shtogren (May 13, 1917 – March 22, 2003) was a major general in the United States Air Force.

Biography
Shtogren was born on May 13, 1917, in Boston, Massachusetts. He would attend Boston College, the College of the Holy Cross, the Massachusetts Institute of Technology, and Columbia University. Shtogren died on March 22, 2003, and is buried at Arlington National Cemetery.

His sister-in-law, Margaret, of Two Rivers, Wisconsin, served in the United States Army as a major during World War II.

Career
Shtogren joined the military in 1940 and was commissioned an officer the following year. During World War II he served with the 2d Air Division.

Following the war he was named Director of Personnel and Administration of the Air Weather Service. He later served as Assistant Chief of Staff and Deputy Chief of Staff of Personnel of the Air Weather Service. In 1951 he was given command of the 2nd Weather Group. From 1954 to 1957 he was stationed in Tokyo, Japan. While there he assisted military leaders of Japan, South Korea, and the Republic of China in the development of a weather service.

After returning to the United States, he was stationed at Westover Air Force Base and Wheeler Air Force Base before being assigned to Pacific Air Forces in 1966. In 1968 he was assigned to the Office of the Joint Chiefs of Staff.

His retirement was effective as of August 1, 1971.

Awards he received include the Distinguished Service Medal, the Legion of Merit with oak leaf cluster, the Army Commendation Medal, the Distinguished Unit Citation, the Outstanding Unit Award with oak leaf cluster, and the Croix de Guerre of France.

References

External links
 

People from Boston
United States Air Force generals
Recipients of the Distinguished Service Medal (US Army)
Recipients of the Legion of Merit
Recipients of the Croix de Guerre (France)
United States Army Air Forces personnel of World War II
Boston College alumni
College of the Holy Cross alumni
Massachusetts Institute of Technology alumni
Columbia University alumni
1917 births
2003 deaths
Burials at Arlington National Cemetery
United States Army Air Forces officers
Military personnel from Massachusetts